The final of the Men's Javelin Throw event at the 2003 Pan American Games took place on Wednesday August 6, 2003. Cuba's Emeterio González set a new PanAm record, with a distance of 81.72 metres. He won the title for the third time in a row.

Medalists

Records

Results

See also
2003 World Championships in Athletics – Men's javelin throw
Athletics at the 2004 Summer Olympics – Men's javelin throw

References
Results

Javelin, Men
2003